Marilyn may refer to:
 Marilyn (given name)
 Marilyn (singer) (born 1962), English singer
 Marilyn (hill), a type of mountain or hill in the British Isles with a prominence above 150 m
 1486 Marilyn, a Main-belt asteroid
 Marilyn (1953 film), directed by Wolf Rilla
 Marilyn (2011 film), a 2011 romance film
 Marilyn (2018 film), a 2018 Argentine film
 Marilyn (Mario character), a character in Paper Mario: The Thousand-Year Door
 "Marilyn", a 2000 horror short story by Jack Dann

Related to Marilyn Monroe
 Marilyn Monroe (1926–1962), an American actress
 Gold Marilyn Monroe, a 1962 painting by Andy Warhol
 Marilyn Diptych, a 1962 painting by Andy Warhol
 Marilyn (1963 film), a documentary film
 Shot Marilyns, a series of 1964 paintings by Andy Warhol
 Untitled from Marilyn Monroe, a 1967 series of silk-screen prints by Andy Warhol
 Marilyn: A Biography, a 1976 biography by Norman Mailer
 Marilyn, a 1980 opera by Lorenzo Ferrero
 Marilyn: The Untold Story, a 1980 television film
 Marilyn: An American Fable, a 1983 musical by Patricia Michaels, Jeanne Napoli, et al.
 My Week with Marilyn, a 2011 film based on incidents during production of The Prince and the Showgirl
 Template:Marilyn Monroe

See also 
 Marilyn Manson, an American singer
 Marilyn Manson (band), an American rock band
 "Mary Lynne" (song), a 1980 song by the band Sector 27 on the album Sector 27